Jason Leavell Coats (born February 24, 1990) is an American former professional baseball outfielder. He has played in Major League Baseball (MLB) for the Chicago White Sox.

Career

Amateur
Coats played college baseball at Texas Christian University (TCU) for the TCU Horned Frogs. In 2010, he played collegiate summer baseball with the Bourne Braves of the Cape Cod Baseball League. After his junior year he was drafted by the Baltimore Orioles in the 12th round of the 2011 Major League Baseball Draft, but did not sign and returned to TCU for his senior year. His senior year came to an end after tearing his ACL during the final game of the regular season.

Chicago White Sox
Coats was drafted by the Chicago White Sox in the 29th round of the 2012 MLB Draft. He made his professional debut in 2013 with the Kannapolis Intimidators. Coats played 2014 with the Winston-Salem Dash and Birmingham Barons, 2015 with Birmingham and the Charlotte Knights and started 2016 with Charlotte.

The White Sox promoted Coats to the major leagues on June 4, and put him in their starting lineup.

Tampa Bay Rays
Coats was claimed off waivers by the Tampa Bay Rays on January 11, 2017. Later that day, Coats tore his right ulnar collateral ligament. He was released on January 30.

On March 13, 2017, Coats signed a minor league deal with the Tampa Bay Rays. He elected free agency on November 2, 2018, and later re-signed to another minor league deal on February 6, 2019, that included an invitation to Spring Training. He was assigned to AAA Durham Bulls to start the 2019 season. He became a free agent following the 2019 season.

References

External links

TCU Horned Frogs bio 

1990 births
Living people
Baseball players from Dallas
Major League Baseball outfielders
Chicago White Sox players
TCU Horned Frogs baseball players
Bourne Braves players
Kannapolis Intimidators players
Winston-Salem Dash players
Birmingham Barons players
Charlotte Knights players
Criollos de Caguas players
Durham Bulls players
Liga de Béisbol Profesional Roberto Clemente outfielders